6th Visual Effects Society Awards
February 10, 2008

Best Visual Effects in a Visual Effects Driven Motion Picture:
Transformers

The 6th Visual Effects Society Awards, given on 10 February 2008 at the Kodak Grand Ballroom, honored the best visual effects in film and television in 2007. An edited version of the awards was later broadcast on HDNet on April 2, 2008.

Winners and nominees
(Winners in bold)

Honorary Awards
Lifetime Achievement Award:
Steven Spielberg

Film

Television

Other categories

References

External links
 Visual Effects Society

2007
Visual Effects Society Awards
Visual Effects Society Awards
Visual Effects Society Awards
Visual Effects Society Awards
Visual Effects Society Awards